Engelman is a surname. Notable people with the surname include:

 Anthony Engelman, Australian actor
 Donald Engelman (born 1941), biochemist
 Peter G. Engelman, English born American writer
 Robert Engelman, American writer

See also 
 Engelmann

Germanic-language surnames

Ethnonymic surnames